Naloxol is an opioid antagonist closely related to naloxone. It exists in two isomeric forms, α-naloxol and β-naloxol.

α-naloxol is a human metabolite of naloxone.  Synthetically, α-naloxol can be prepared from naloxone by reduction of the ketone group, and β-naloxol can be prepared from α-naloxol by a Mitsunobu reaction.

Naloxol can be said to be the oxymorphol analogue of naloxone.

See also
 Naloxegol

References

4,5-Epoxymorphinans
Human drug metabolites
Mu-opioid receptor antagonists
Allyl compounds